Gregorio Álvarez (28 November 1889, in Ranquilón, Ñorquín, Territory of Neuquén – 11 October 1986) was an Argentine historian, physician and writer.

Biography
Álvarez became a teacher in 1910. In 1919 he graduated as a medical doctor at the University of Buenos Aires, specializing in dermatology. He was a founder of the Argentine Dermatological Association.

In 1950 he explored the Copahue hotsprings. He also made research on infantile eczema, obtaining the golden medal from Jammes Laboratories, Paris, in 1954.

Álvarez explored Neuquén Province on horseback, studying its culture.

The dinosaur genus Alvarezsaurus and the family Alvarezsauridae are named in his honor. He died on 11 October 1986 at the age of 96.

References

1889 births
1986 deaths
People from Neuquén Province
University of Buenos Aires alumni
Argentine dermatologists
20th-century Argentine historians
Argentine male writers
Male non-fiction writers